Mixed Up is a remix album by English rock band the Cure, released on 20 November 1990 by Fiction Records. The songs are remixes of some of their hits, reflecting the popularity of remixing of existing songs and dance culture of the late 1980s and early 1990s. In 2018, a sequel was released titled Torn Down.

Most of the songs are extended mixes. Several had been previously released on 12" singles, but some are completely remade, with Smith recutting vocals due to the original tapes not being available. The record closes with the extended version of a new single, "Never Enough". The remix of "Pictures of You" was originally released under the title "(Strange Mix)".  In an interview featured on the Trilogy DVD, singer Robert Smith described the remix album as something "fun after the doom and gloom of Disintegration".

The Cure also released some other new mixes as the b-sides of the singles from Mixed Up: the first single, "Never Enough", featured a remix of "Let's Go to Bed", entitled "Let's Go to Bed" (Milk Mix) (on the 12", cassette and CD versions), as well as a new song, "Harold and Joe", while the second single, "Close to Me (Remix)" contained "Just Like Heaven" (Dizzy Mix) (on all formats) and "Primary" (Red Mix) (on the 12", CD and cassette versions) as B-sides, the third single, "A Forest" (Tree Mix) contained the original version of the song and "Inbetween Days" (Shiver Mix) (only on 5-inch CD) as B-sides.

Track listing

LP edition

CD edition

Notes
 CD editions do not include "Why Can't I Be You?" (Extended Remix), this was due to the 74-minute (later 80-minute) limit necessary to be compliant with the Compact Disc standard.
As the original master tapes could not be found, "A Forest" and "The Walk" are not remixes, they are re-recordings.
Over time, the CD edition has slightly changed. At the time of release, the words "Mixed Up" at the bottom of the cover were white in a box, but have since changed to black in a box. Also, the order of text on the CD disc has slightly been rearranged. Also, the track listing on the back cover, text in the liner notes and the text on the album cover (bar the small "Mixed Up" at the bottom) were originally a metallic. Now they are grey.

2018 remastered reissue
On 21 April 2018, Mixed Up was released as a remastered deluxe edition. The accompanying statement read: "Robert Smith has remastered The Cure's remix album from 1990. Now presented for the first time as double picture disc set in a gatefold sleeve with a download voucher."

A 3-disc deluxe edition of Mixed Up was released on 15 June 2018. The announcement read: "The Mixed Up 3-CD set includes Mixed Up, a second disc of rare remixes from 1981 through 1990, and a third disc of brand new remixes by Robert Smith. All the material has been remastered in 2018, or, with respect to Torn Down, mixed in 2018."

In an interview with BBC Radio 6, Robert Smith confirmed that this release marks the continuation of The Cure's deluxe edition re-release campaign, and that the deluxe edition of Wish had been completed and would follow.

CD 1: Mixed Up (remastered by Robert Smith 2018)

CD 2: Remixes 1982–1990: Mixed Up Extras 2018

CD 3: Torn Down: Mixed Up Extras 2018
All songs remixed by Robert Smith.

Personnel
 Robert Smith – vocals, guitar, six-string bass, keyboards
 Simon Gallup – bass
 Porl Thompson – guitar, six-string bass
 Boris Williams – drums
 Roger O'Donnell – keyboards
 Andy Anderson – drums
 Lol Tolhurst – drums

Charts

Weekly charts

Year-end charts

Certifications

References

The Cure remix albums
1990 remix albums
Albums produced by Mark Saunders (record producer)
Albums produced by David M. Allen
Elektra Records remix albums
Fiction Records remix albums